Geeta Shakya also known as Geeta alias chandra prabha is an Indian politician and a Member of Parliament in the Rajya Sabha from Uttar Pradesh. She is a member of the Bharatiya Janata Party.

She is a former district president of the BJP from Auraiya and a prominent leader among the OBC.

Personal life

She began her career as a teacher and was a Principal from 2005 to 2010 and her husband has also been a Principal. She has two children, a son and a daughter. Her son rishab is in the BSF's Engineering Corps and her daughter is married.

Political career

Geeta Shakya began her political career as Gram Pradhan from Shihuan Gram Panchayat in 2000.

Later she joined the Bharatiya Janata Party and became the district president of Auraiya for two years.

She is considered a close aide of Deputy CM Keshav Prasad Maurya. She is prominent as a leader among the Other Backward Classes in the state.

References

Living people
Bharatiya Janata Party politicians from Uttar Pradesh
Rajya Sabha members from Uttar Pradesh
Samajwadi Party politicians from Uttar Pradesh
People from Auraiya district
1969 births